The list of ship launches in 1945 includes a chronological list of some of the ships launched in 1945.


References 

Sources

1945
Ship launches